Pristine Smut is an album released by American alternative pop band the Murmurs; it was released on June 24, 1997, by MCA. The album was produced by Larry Klein and k.d. lang and all tracks on the album were written by The Murmurs members Heather Grody and Leisha Hailey. The track "Squeezebox Days" featured on the soundtrack to the 1997 film All Over Me.

Recording
The album's co-producer k.d. lang had started dating band member Leisha Hailey in 1996, a year before the album was recorded. In a 2000 interview, Lang reflected "We [didn't] want to get involved in each other's art [...] My producing of the Murmurs was just to help them out because I had a studio and they needed tracks done. And it was fun for me because I always wanted to produce a girl group like that." Its working title was The Ballad of Pristine Smut.

The track  "Sleepless Commotion" was written by Heather Grody, about the murder of her mother, who was killed by her husband.

Release and reception
The album was poorly promoted by the band's label, MCA Records, who were going through staff changes at the time.

In a review for Allmusic, Stephen Thomas Erlewine gave Pristine Smut a star rating of four out of five. He noted that the album had a rhythm section added to the "folk pop" of its predecessor, 1994's Murmurs. He praised producers Klein and Lang for steering the band towards "adult alternative rock" but said that the sound was "clean and pristine ... shined and polished and now ready for radio". He said, however, that the songs on Pristine Smut were stronger than those of the previous album.

Robert Christgau gave the album an A− rating and praised it as an improvement on their previous album. He said of Pristine Smut, "not since Liz Phair's "Flower", Janet's "Throb", and Madonna's Erotica has pop softcore attended so sweetly to the erogenous zones." In a review for The Advocate, Barry Walters also noted the "rockin' rhythm section" of the second album. He described the tracks produced by Lang as "punk[y]" and "Nirvana-esque" and the ones produced by Klein as "like Suzanne Vega before dance beats discovered her".

It was nominated for an award for Album of the Year at the Gay & Lesbian American Music Awards in 1998.

Track listing
"Big Talker"
"I'm a Mess"
"Toy"
"Underdog"
"About Nothin'"
"Genius"
"Squeeze Box Days"
"Don't Lie"
"Sucker Upper"
"Country Song"
"Sleepless Commotion"

Personnel

Music
Teddy Borowiecki — keyboards
Heather Grody — guitar, electric guitar, vocals
Leisha Hailey — guitar, vocals
Larry Klein — bass, electric guitar, Hammond organ
Greg Leisz — mandolin, pedal steel
Jerry Marotta — drums
Ben Mink — guitar, strings
Sheri Ozeki — bass
Sherri Solinger — drums

Production
Larry Klein — arranger, producer
k.d. lang — producer
Ben Mink — arranger
Tony Phillips — engineer, mixing
Marc Ramaer — engineer
Skip Saylor — engineer, mixing
Eddy Schreyer — mastering
Design
Todd Gallopo — art direction, design
Dave Jensen — photography
Tim Stedman — art direction, design

References

1997 albums
The Murmurs albums
Albums produced by Larry Klein
MCA Records albums